Eric Stubbe (born in 1959) is the Honorary Consul of the Federal Republic of Germany in Puerto Rico.

After his appointment by the Christian Wulff, President of the Federal Republic of Germany, Stubbe was sworn in by then-Consul General Klaus Ranner, who was then posted in Miami before becoming Consul General in Dubai on August 2, 2010 at a ceremony attended by Puerto Rico's Chief Justice Federico Hernandez Denton,  Secretary of State Kenneth McClintock and members of the Consular Corps in Puerto Rico.

See also

 List of Puerto Ricans
 German immigration to Puerto Rico

References

Puerto Rican people of German descent
Living people
Place of birth missing (living people)
1959 births